Magill Cottage is a historic cure cottage located at Saranac Lake in the town of Harrietstown, Franklin County, New York.  It was built about 1911 and is a -story, wood-frame structure on a concrete foundation.  It is topped by a hipped roof with two steeply pitched cross gable extensions in the Queen Anne style.  It has a large 1-story porch and two second-story sleeping porches.  It operated as a private sanatorium until 1926.

It was listed on the National Register of Historic Places in 1992.

References

Houses on the National Register of Historic Places in New York (state)
Queen Anne architecture in New York (state)
Houses completed in 1911
Houses in Franklin County, New York
National Register of Historic Places in Franklin County, New York